Fluorescent may refer to:
 Fluorescence, the emission of light by a substance that has absorbed light or other electromagnetic radiation

Music
 "Fluorescent", a song by Gwen Stefani from her second studio album, The Sweet Escape
 "Fluorescent", a song by Pet Shop Boys from their twelfth studio album, Electric

See also 
 Fluorescent Grey, an extended play by Deerhunter